Kosmos 1977 ( meaning Cosmos 1977) is a Soviet US-K missile early warning satellite which was launched in 1988 as part of the Soviet military's Oko programme. The satellite is designed to identify missile launches using optical telescopes and infrared sensors.

Kosmos 1977 was launched from Site 41/1 at Plesetsk Cosmodrome in the Russian SSR. A Molniya-M carrier rocket with a 2BL upper stage was used to perform the launch, which took place at 18:02 UTC on 25 October 1988. The launch successfully placed the satellite into a molniya orbit. It subsequently received its Kosmos designation, and the international designator 1988-096A. The United States Space Command assigned it the Satellite Catalog Number 19608.

See also

List of Kosmos satellites (1751–2000)
List of R-7 launches (1985–1989)
1988 in spaceflight
List of Oko satellites

References

Kosmos satellites
Spacecraft launched in 1988
Oko
Spacecraft launched by Molniya-M rockets
1988 in the Soviet Union